Graeme Donald Watson (8 March 1945 – 24 April 2020) was an Australian cricketer who played in five Test matches and two One Day Internationals (ODIs) between 1966 and 1972.

Cricket career

Watson made his first-class cricket debut for Victoria in 1964–65 before moving to Western Australia from 1971–72 to 1974–75, and then to New South Wales in 1976–77, when he became the first man to play Sheffield Shield cricket for three states. He played minor matches in World Series Cricket in 1977–78 and 1978–79.

Watson's highest first-class score came for the Australians against Hampshire County Cricket Club during Australia's tour of England in 1972. He and Keith Stackpole put on 301 for the first wicket, Watson scoring 176 in 234 minutes with 26 fours and five sixes, and taking the Australians to victory by nine wickets.

In all first-class cricket he scored 4674 runs at 32.68, with seven centuries, and took 186 wickets at 25.31, with five wickets or more in an innings eight times and best figures of 6 for 61 against South Australia in Melbourne in 1965–66.

Football career
He also played 18 games of Australian rules football for Melbourne in the Victorian Football League (VFL) in 1964 and 1965.

Personal life
Watson was a qualified architect and worked in sports stadium management, including the Sydney Olympic precinct. He had four marriages.

He died on 24 April 2020 from cancer.

References

Sources
 Cashman, R. (ed.) (1996) The Oxford Companion to Australian Cricket, Oxford: Melbourne. .

External links 

 Brydon Coverdale, "Australia's Winter Allrounders: XI Test Cricketers who played Australian rules football at the highest level", Cricinfo, 28 May 2007

1945 births
2020 deaths
Australia Test cricketers
Australia One Day International cricketers
New South Wales cricketers
Victoria cricketers
Western Australia cricketers
Melbourne Football Club players
World Series Cricket players
Melbourne Cricket Club cricketers
International Cavaliers cricketers
Australian cricketers
Australian rules footballers from Melbourne
People from Kew, Victoria
20th-century Australian architects
Architects from Melbourne
Cricketers from Melbourne